Barbara Rappaport is an American bridge player.

Bridge accomplishments

Awards

 Fishbein Trophy (1) 1971

Wins

 North American Bridge Championships (3)
 Smith Life Master Women's Pairs (1) 1977 
 von Zedtwitz Life Master Pairs (2) 1971, 1972

Runners-up

 North American Bridge Championships (8)
 Chicago Mixed Board-a-Match (3) 1966, 1974, 1975 
 Smith Life Master Women's Pairs (2) 1973, 1974 
 Wagar Women's Knockout Teams (2) 1969, 1971 
 Whitehead Women's Pairs (1) 1978

Notes

American contract bridge players